Michael Schiechl (born January 29, 1989) is an Austrian professional ice hockey player who is currently playing with the Graz99ers of the ICE Hockey League (ICEHL).

On May 5, 2014, Schiechl signed a two-year contract extension to continue with the Vienna Capitals. At the conclusion of his contract with the Capitals, Schiechl opted to return to Salzburg signing a one-year deal on August 19, 2016.

He participated at the 2011 IIHF World Championship as a member of the Austria men's national ice hockey team.

References

External links

1989 births
Living people
People from Judenburg
Austrian ice hockey forwards
Graz 99ers players
EC Red Bull Salzburg players
Vienna Capitals players
Sportspeople from Styria